The Dark Side of the Heart 2 is a 2001 Argentine-Spanish surreal drama film written and directed by Eliseo Subiela, which stars Darío Grandinetti and Ariadna Gil. It is a sequel to 1992 film The Dark Side of the Heart, following on the vicissitudes of the character played by Grandinetti in his search for an ideal woman.

Plot 
Hitherto based in Buenos Aires, Argentina, poet Oliverio travels to Barcelona, Spain, to search for prostitute and soulmate Ana. Once there, he meets with circus acrobat Alejandra.

Cast

Production 
The film is an Enrique Cerezo PC, Tornasol Films, and Argentina Sonfilm Argentine-Spanish coproduction. Teo Delgado worked as cinematographer, whereas Osvaldo Montes was responsible for the music and Juan Carlos Macías for editing. Shooting locations included Buenos Aires, Barcelona, and Sitges.

Release 
The film premiered on 5 July 2001. It was theatrically released in Spain on 5 July 2002.

Reception 
Eddie Cockrell of Variety considered the film to be "a cheeky, sexy, elegant new chapter" in the adventures of the leading character.

Accolades 

|-
| align = "center" | 2001 || 27th Huelva Ibero-American Film Festival || Best Director || Eliseo Subiela ||  ||
|-
| align = "center" rowspan = "3" | 2002 || rowspan = "3" | 50th Silver Condor Awards || Best Director || Eliseo Subiela ||  || rowspan = "3" |
|-
| Best Actress || Ariadna Gil || 
|-
| Best Supporting Actress || Sandra Ballesteros ||  
|}

See also 
 List of Argentine films of 2001
 List of Spanish films of 2002

References 

2001 drama films
2000s Spanish-language films
Argentine drama films
Spanish drama films
2000s Argentine films
2000s Spanish films
Films set in Buenos Aires
Films set in Barcelona
Films shot in Buenos Aires
Films shot in Barcelona
Films shot in the province of Barcelona
Tornasol Films films
Enrique Cerezo PC films